Mary Frances Clinton, born 8 May 1960 in Darfield, New Zealand) is a former female field hockey player from New Zealand, who was a member of the national team that finished sixth at the 1984 Summer Olympics in Los Angeles, California. Eight years later she competed with at the 1992 Summer Olympics in Barcelona, where the team ended up in eight position. She was the first female woman to play more than 100 matches for the national team.

References
 New Zealand Olympic Committee

External links
 

New Zealand female field hockey players
Olympic field hockey players of New Zealand
Field hockey players at the 1984 Summer Olympics
Field hockey players at the 1992 Summer Olympics
1960 births
Living people
People from Darfield, New Zealand
Sportspeople from Canterbury, New Zealand